Mount Calvary Cemetery may refer to:

United States
Mount Calvary Cemetery (Davenport, Iowa)
Mount Calvary Cemetery (Dubuque), Iowa
Mount Calvary Cemetery (Columbus, Ohio)
Mount Calvary Cemetery (Portland, Oregon)

See also
 Calvary Cemetery (disambiguation)